Bradburia pilosa, the soft goldenaster, is a North American species of flowering plants in the family Asteraceae, native to the south-central United States, primarily the southeastern Great Plains and lower Mississippi Valley, in the states of Texas, Oklahoma, Kansas, Missouri, Arkansas, Louisiana, Tennessee, Mississippi, and Alabama. Additional populations are reported farther east (from Florida to Virginia) but these appear to be introductions. Its habitats include disturbed roadsides and pine-oak-juniper woods.

Bradburia pilosa is an annual up to 80 cm (32 inches) tall with yellow flower heads. Disc florets are fertile, unlike in the closely related B. hirtella.

References

External links
Wildflower Lense photos
Southeastern Flora
Lady Bird Johnson Wildflower Center, University of Texas
Kansas Wildflowers and Grasses

Astereae
Plants described in 1834
Flora of the Southeastern United States
Flora of the North-Central United States
Flora of the South-Central United States
Flora without expected TNC conservation status